Lucille Marie Raymonde Savoie (May 13, 1938September 4, 2020), known professionally as Lucille Starr, was a Canadian singer, songwriter, and yodeler originally from Saint Boniface, Manitoba. She was best known for her 1964 hit single, "The French Song" ("Quand Le Soleil Dit Bonjour Aux Montagnes", When the sun says hello to the mountains).

Early life
Starr was born in the Franco-Manitoban community of Saint Boniface to a musical family. During her childhood years in Saint Boniface, she first sang in church. When Starr was seven the family moved to Maillardville, a Francophone community in Coquitlam, British Columbia, where she learned to play guitar, bass and mandolin.

Career
Savoie started her musical career with the local group Les Hirondelles.  She met and married country singer Bob Regan (born Robert Frederickson), and, using the stage name Lucille Starr, she began performing with him as a country singing duo called "Bob & Lucille". Between 1958 and 1963 they released several 45 rpm records that were mainly covers of an eclectic mix of fashionable country, pop, rockabilly and folk songs of people such as Perry Como to Connie Francis. Their records met with modest success on the North American West Coast and in 1963 they were signed by A&M Records in Los Angeles, California, with which they began recording as "The Canadian Sweethearts".

At A&M Records, Starr recorded a song called "The French Song" that was produced by Herb Alpert. This name was chosen because Alpert could not pronounce the original French title "Quand le soleil dit bonjour aux montagnes" (When the sun says Good day to the mountains). It was recorded in a bilingual version with French lyrics in the first half followed by the English translation in the second half. In 1964, at a time when The Beatles dominated the music charts, "The French Song" was an international success that made Starr the first Canadian artist to have a record sell over a million copies. The popularity of the song led to a tour of the United States and appearing on the Louisiana Hayride radio show and on Chicago radio station WLS (AM) popular National Barn Dance. Starr also sang on American television musical variety shows such as Shindig! and Hullabaloo, followed by tours of Pacific Rim countries, Australia, South Africa, and across Europe where she became a particular favorite in the Netherlands. The song sold over one million copies, and it was awarded a gold disc.

In 1967, Starr and her Canadian Sweethearts duo signed a recording contract with Epic Records in Nashville, Tennessee. Divorced from her first husband, their musical collaboration ended in 1977. Although she never again had a hit of the magnitude of "The French Song", Starr enjoyed a long and prosperous career recording primarily in English but also in French and Spanish. For the most part she sang country music, becoming the first female inducted into the Canadian Country Music Association’s "Hall of Honor" in 1987. A capable yodeler, she was hired to do the yodeling for the "Cousin Pearl" character on several segments of the hit TV series, The Beverly Hillbillies.

Back to You: the Life and Music of Lucille Starr, a jukebox musical with a script by Tracey Power, was performed at the Prairie Theatre Exchange in Winnipeg in November 2010.

In her honour, a street in the city of Coquitlam was named "Lucille Starr Way".

Death
Starr died in Las Vegas, Nevada, in the early morning hours of September 4, 2020. The announcement of her death was made on Facebook by fellow Canadian artist, Joyce Smith.

The family said she is survived by her second husband Brian Cunningham, her son Robert Frederickson, stepdaughter Shannon Cunningham and stepson David Cunningham.

Discography

Albums

Singles

References

 Canadian Records: A Discography & Price Guide of Canadian 45's & LP's from 1955 to 1975, Andre Gibeault, 1987 (OOP)

External links
 Encyclopedia of Music in Canada – Starr, Lucille
 
 Entries at 45cat.com

1938 births
2020 deaths
Canadian women country singers
Canadian country singer-songwriters
Franco-Manitoban people
Musicians from Winnipeg
People from Coquitlam
People from Saint Boniface, Winnipeg
French-language singers of Canada
A&M Records artists
Epic Records artists
Canadian expatriate musicians in the United States
Canadian rockabilly musicians